Richard James "Rick" Witter (born 23 November 1972 in Stockport, Cheshire) is a singer, songwriter in the York-based band Shed Seven.

He was educated at Huntington School, York.

Professional career
Rick Witter formed his first band with schoolfriend Paul Banks in 1986, while still in his teens, and played in various local bands, including Brockley Haven, with Banks, Tom Gladwin and John Leach.

Shed Seven
In 1990, Witter, along with Gladwin, John's brother, drummer Alan Leach and guitarist Joe Johnson formed Shed Seven. Rick signed his first record deal with the band in 1993. Just prior to signing their six-album deal with Polydor Records, Banks joined the line-up as their new lead guitarist, replacing the departing Joe Johnson. Rick spent the following 10 years recording and touring with the band, co-writing many of the band's songs as they went on to have thirteen consecutive Top 40 hits in the UK Singles Chart.

Rick Witter & the Dukes
Rick also fronts Rick Witter & the Dukes, who feature Rob Wilson on guitar and Stuart Fletcher (ex-Seahorses) on bass. They independently released their debut album The Year of the Rat in April 2007. The LP is dedicated to the memory of Roger Witter, Rick's father.

Other projects
Witter is also a DJ and regularly hosts nights throughout the United Kingdom, playing vintage indie classics.

See also
List of people from Stockport
List of notable people associated with York

References

External links
Official Website

1972 births
Living people
English male singers
English songwriters
Musicians from Manchester
Music in the Metropolitan Borough of Stockport
People from Stockport
Britpop musicians
21st-century English singers
21st-century British male singers
British male songwriters